Zdeněk Klesnil (born 28 October 1986 in Kroměříž) is a Czech football striker who currently plays for the Gambrinus liga club SK Sigma Olomouc.

Honours 
SK Sigma Olomouc
 Czech Cup: 2011–12

References

External links 
 SK Sigma Olomouc profile
 

1986 births
Living people
Association football forwards
Czech footballers
SK Sigma Olomouc players
SFC Opava players
Czech First League players
People from Kroměříž
Sportspeople from the Zlín Region